Ørum Church may refer to:

 Ørum Church (Norddjurs Municipality)
 Ørum Church (Skive Municipality)

See also 
 Ørum (disambiguation)